Chan Yung-jan and Chuang Chia-jung were the defending champions, but Chan chose not to participate, and only Chuang competed that year.

Chuang partnered with Rika Fujiwara, but lost in the quarterfinals to Vania King and Alla Kudryavtseva.

Cara Black and Liezel Huber won in the final 6–2, 6–1, against Séverine Brémond and Virginia Ruano Pascual.

Seeds

  Cara Black /  Liezel Huber (champions)
  Alona Bondarenko /  Kateryna Bondarenko (first round)
  Lisa Raymond /  Samantha Stosur (first round)
  Bethanie Mattek /  Sania Mirza (first round)

Draw

Draw

References
 2008 DFS Classic Draws
 ITF Tournament Page
 ITF doubles results page

DFS Classic - Doubles
Doubles

fr:Classic de Birmingham 2008
nl:WTA-toernooi van Birmingham 2008
pl:DFS Classic 2008